Asperhofen is a town in the district of Sankt Pölten-Land in the Austrian state of Lower Austria.

Geography
Asperhofen lies in the Mostviertel in Lower Austria, 6 km north of Neulengbach, on the edge of the Haspel Forest on the road to Tulln. About 20.87 percent of the municipality is forested.

References

Cities and towns in St. Pölten-Land District